Ola Nordmann is a national personification of Norwegians, either for individuals or collectively. It is also used as a placeholder name. The female counterpart is Kari Nordmann, and collectively they are referred to as Ola og Kari Nordmann (Ola and Kari Nordmann).

Usage of the name Ola Nordmann

As a national personification
The media often uses "Ola Nordmann" to describe trends in the population.

For example: A headline in a newspaper that reads Norwegians consume less milk could just as well read Ola Nordmann drinks less milk.

Caricatures of Ola Nordmann as a national personification of Norway usually depict him as a blond-haired man dressed in bunad-like traditional folk clothing and wearing a woollen red top cap - the traditional headwear of a Norwegian gnome or nisse. This headwear was also worn by the traditional Norwegian farmer, mostly in the old Norwegian farm culture. In the romantic national period, the farmer often came to represent the Norwegian people as a whole, hence the representation.

As a placeholder name
Ola Nordmann is also used as a default name in examples used to guide people in how to fill in forms etc. (similar to Joe Bloggs in the UK or John Doe in America). In legal examples, Peder Ås is often used as a placeholder name instead.

Etymology
Ola is a common male first name in Norway (derived from Olav/Olaf), and Nordmann is a demonym for a Norwegian, i.e. "Ola Norwegian".

Kari Nordmann
The female equivalent or variant is personified as Kari Nordmann, "Kari and Ola Nordmann" is often used together to describe the archetypical Norwegian family or household.

See also
Joe Bloggs
John Bull
John Doe
John Q. Public
Ole and Lena
Uncle Sam

References

National personifications
Norwegian culture
Norwegian folklore
Fictional Norwegian people
Placeholder names